The Wormsloe Historic Site, informally known as Wormsloe Plantation, is a state historic site near Savannah, Georgia, in the southeastern United States. The site consists of  protecting part of what was once the Wormsloe Plantation, a large estate established by one of Georgia's colonial founders, Noble Jones (c. 1700-1775). The site includes a picturesque  oak avenue, the ruins of Jones' fortified house built of tabby, a museum, and a  demonstration area interpreting colonial daily life.

He constructed a fortified house on the southeastern tip of the island overlooking the Skidaway Narrows, a strategic section of the Skidaway River located along the Intracoastal Waterway roughly halfway between downtown Savannah and the Atlantic Ocean. The fortified house was part of a network of defensive structures established by James Oglethorpe, founder of Georgia, and early Georgia colonists to protect Savannah from a potential Spanish invasion. Jones subsequently developed Wormsloe into a small plantation, and his descendants built a large mansion at the site which they used as a country residence.

The State of Georgia acquired the bulk of the Wormsloe Plantation in 1973, and opened it to the public as a state historic site in 1979.

Geographic setting

The Skidaway River, which is part of the Atlantic Intracoastal Waterway, forms the island's eastern shore. The island's southwest shore is formed by the Moon River, and the island's northwest shore formed by the Herb River. Typical of Georgia's inshore coastal islands, the Isle of Hope is completely surrounded by a tidal salt marsh. Skidaway Island is located opposite the Skidaway River to the east and the Georgia mainland is located opposite the Moon River to the west. Wormsloe occupies most of the southern half of the Isle of Hope.

A small island known as Long Island lies between Skidaway Island and the Isle of Hope and splits the Skidaway River into two narrow channels, the main (navigable) channel of which is known as the Skidaway Narrows. The main channel of the Skidaway River presently flows between Long Island and Skidaway Island, although in colonial times the main channel flowed between Long Island and the Isle of Hope, giving Wormsloe its historically strategic importance.

Skidaway Road connects Wormsloe and the Isle of Hope to U.S. Route 80 near downtown Savannah. The Isle of Hope is located entirely within Chatham County. Wormsloe Historic Site is managed by the Georgia Department of Natural Resources.

History

Early history

Native Americans have probably inhabited the Isle of Hope on at least a semi-annual basis for thousands of years, as indicated by oyster shell deposits excavated in the vicinity. By the time European explorers arrived in the area in the 16th century, the island was claimed by the Yuchi and the Creek tribe. When the first permanent English colonists landed at what is now Savannah in 1733, the island was part of the domain of the Yamacraw, a detached branch of the Creeks, although the island was apparently uninhabited at the time. James Oglethorpe, the leader of these English colonists, maintained a friendly relationship with the Yamacraw chief Tomochichi, and managed to peacefully acquire the Savannah area and the lands in its vicinity.

Throughout the late 17th-century, Spain (which had established itself in Florida in the previous century) retained loose control over the Georgia coast via Native American allies. This inevitably brought them into conflict with the growing English colonies to the north, namely North Carolina and South Carolina. In 1702, South Carolina governor James Moore led an expedition against Spanish settlements in Florida and, en route, raided and destroyed the Spanish Native American missions off the Georgia coast. While Spain still claimed the coast and islands, the area was largely abandoned, creating a buffer zone between Spanish Florida and the English Carolinas.

In the early 1730s, the English decided to colonize the islands between the Carolinas and Florida. A charter was granted in 1732, and the first colonists set sail in the same year. The English colonists that arrived at Savannah in 1733 formed the core of what would eventually become the colony and state of Georgia. Among them was Noble Jones (d. 1775), a physician and carpenter from Lambeth, England who made the Transatlantic crossing with his wife and two children. Jones was apparently a loose acquaintance of Oglethorpe, and just before the colonists set sail from England, the colony's Trustees made Jones one of the settlement's lead officials.  Like the other first settlers, Jones received a town lot in Savannah and a small farm on the outskirts of the town.

Establishment of Wormsloe

The house was constructed between 1739 and 1745 using wood and tabby, a crude type of concrete made from oyster shells and lime. The fort house was 1.5 stories and had five rooms. Oglethorpe allotted Jones' fort a 12-man marine garrison and a scout boat with which to patrol the river. "Wormslow"— the name Jones gave to his Isle of Hope estate— probably refers to Wormslow Hundred, Herefordshire, in the Welsh border country from which the Jones family hailed. Some historians suggest the name refers to Jones' attempts to cultivate silkworms at the plantation, but as his son Noble Wimberly Jones named his plantation "Lambeth" after his birthplace on the south bank of the Thames, the former theory is more likely.

Noble Jones' fortified house was one of several defensive works built between Frederica on Saint Simons Island and the Savannah townsite. The English were concerned that the Spanish still claimed the area and would eventually attempt to expel them. Conflict erupted in 1739 with the outbreak of the War of Jenkins' Ear, the name for the regional theater of the greater War of the Austrian Succession. Jones took part in an English raid along the St. Johns River in northern Florida in 1740, as well as the successful defense of Frederica at the Battle of Bloody Marsh in 1742. The end of the war in 1748 largely neutralized Spanish threats to the new colony.

The War of Jenkins' Ear is commemorated annually on the last Saturday in May at Wormsloe Plantation.

Antebellum Wormsloe
The practice of slavery had been banned by Georgia's original charter, so Noble Jones used indentured servant labor to tend Wormsloe in the plantation's early years.  When the Trustees revoked the ban on slavery in 1749, Jones used slave labor in order to make Wormsloe profitable. Jones initially planted several types of crops, including corn, rice, various fruits and vegetables, and possibly indigo. The Georgia Trustees encouraged the production of silk; Jones planted mulberry trees and tried unsuccessfully to produce silk at Wormsloe. While Wormsloe never proved profitable, Jones managed to amass real estate wealth throughout his lifetime, including  and five town lots in the Savannah area.  Jones served the young colony in multiple civic capacities, as judge, militia captain, and colonial legislator.

With the death of Noble Jones in 1775, Wormsloe passed to his daughter, Mary Jones Bulloch (c. 1730-1795). Jones' death occurred just as the American colonies were on the verge of breaking away from England. Jones remained a loyal supporter of King George III throughout his life, a stance that often brought him in direct conflict with his son, Noble Wimberly Jones (1723–1805), who was an ardent supporter of Patriot causes. Noble Wimberly led the Georgia Commons House in its rejection of the Townshend Acts in 1768, and took part in a mission that seized a large supply of gunpowder from the provincial powder magazine in 1776. Noble Jones' will stipulated that after the death of his daughter, Wormsloe would pass to Noble Wimberly and thence to Noble Wimberly's heirs "forever." Thus Noble Wimberly inherited Wormsloe in 1795 upon the death of his sister, and deeded the plantation to his son George Jones (1766–1838) in 1804.

George Jones, who served as a U.S. senator and in various capacities in the Savannah government, built a new, more elaborate house at Wormsloe in 1828, which is the plantation house that is still standing, and made cotton a staple of the plantation. Jones's son, George Frederick Tilghman Jones (1827–1880), inherited Wormsloe in 1857.

George Frederick Tilghman Jones took an active interest in Wormsloe (he changed the spelling from "Wormslow" to "Wormsloe"), enlarging the plantation's gardens, adding the first oak-lined avenue, and expanding the house. He changed his name to George Wimberley Jones De Renne (a corruption of his grandmother's maiden name, Van Deren). He began publishing a periodical collection of rare early Georgia documents under the title, the Wormsloe Quartos.

During the American Civil War (1861–1865), Wormsloe and the Isle of Hope were fortified by Confederate forces. When Union forces captured Savannah in 1864, the Jones/De Renne family was forced to flee.  Although the plantation was confiscated by the U.S. government (it seized the property of planters who had supported the Confederacy), the property was eventually returned when De Renne was granted a full pardon by President Andrew Johnson.

Wormsloe in the 20th century
In his will, George Wimberley Jones De Renne entrusted Wormsloe to a Pennsylvania insurance  company until the death of his son, Wimberley Jones De Renne (1853–1916), at which time the estate would pass to his grandchildren. Wimberley Jones De Renne maintained Wormsloe, further expanding the gardens and planting a new oak avenue (still in use) lined with over 400 oak trees. He continued his father's contributions to history and tradition, publishing several works for the Georgia Historical Society and establishing Wormsloe's library. Upon his death in 1916, Wormsloe passed to the grandchildren of George Wimberley Jones De Renne. In 1917, one grandson, Wymberley Wormsloe De Renne (1891–1966), bought his cousins' shares of the plantation.

In 1930 after the stock market crash, Elfrida De Renne Barrow (1884–1970) assumed her brother Wymberly's debts, and eventually made the plantation her official residence. Barrow created the Wormsloe Foundation, which continued and expanded the family tradition of publishing works related to Georgia history.

In 1961, Barrow donated most of the Wormsloe estate to the Wormsloe Foundation, while retaining ownership of Wormsloe House and its immediate area. In 1972, after the Wormsloe Foundation's tax-exempt status was revoked, the foundation transferred ownership of Wormsloe to the Nature Conservancy, which in turn transferred it to the State of Georgia the following year. In 1979, the state opened the site to the public as Wormsloe Historic Site. The descendants of Noble Jones still control Wormsloe House and its surrounding acreage.

Wormsloe Historic Site
The arched entrance to Wormsloe is located just off Skidaway Road, near the Isle of Hope community. The state-controlled area includes the scenic oak-lined avenue, a museum, and a walking trail that leads through the dense maritime forest to the ruins of the tabby fort built by Jones in 1745. More recently, the park has established a colonial life demonstration area, which includes a replica wattle and daub hut and several small outbuildings that simulate a living area for Jones' marines and slaves.

The Wormsloe site is within a dense oak-pine maritime forest. Much of the forest originally pre-dated European settlement of the Isle of Hope, but a southern pine beetle infestation in the 1970s killed off most of the old-growth pines. A short interpretive trail near the museum displays prints of wildlife and birds by the 18th-century naturalist Mark Catesby.

See also
National Register of Historic Places listings in Chatham County, Georgia

References

Further reading

Swanson, Drew A. "Wormsloe's Belly." Southern Cultures 15, no. 4 (Winter 2009): 50-66.
Mayo, Marcia, "The Shadow Playground - Childhood Memories of wormsloe Plantation in the 1950s and 1960s", Georgia Backroads, Autumn 2010, vol 9, #3, pp. 14–16

External links
Wormsloe Historic Site — official site at Georgia State Parks

Noble Jones' "Wormslow" 1736-1775 historical marker
 Wormsloe Pamphlet 
William Bartram Trail historical marker at Wormsloe 

State parks of Georgia (U.S. state)
Historic districts on the National Register of Historic Places in Georgia (U.S. state)
Plantations in Georgia (U.S. state)
Rural history museums in Georgia (U.S. state)
Museums in Savannah, Georgia
Protected areas established in 1973
Protected areas of Chatham County, Georgia
Houses in Savannah, Georgia
National Register of Historic Places in Chatham County, Georgia
Tourist attractions in Savannah, Georgia
Cotton plantations in Georgia (U.S. state)
Tabby buildings